Graham Evan Williams (born 2 April 1938) is a Welsh former footballer who played as a full back. He spent his entire 17-year professional career at West Bromwich Albion.

Biography 
Williams was born in Henllan, Denbighshire. He joined West Bromwich Albion as an amateur in September 1954 and turned professional in April 1955. He captained the side to victory in the 1966 Football League Cup Final and 1968 FA Cup Final, scoring in the second leg of the 1966 final against West Ham United. He also won 26 caps for Wales.

After leaving Albion in 1972 he took up the post of player-manager with Weymouth, with whom he remained until 1975. In November 1981, he was appointed chief coach of Cardiff City, taking over from Richie Morgan, who moved to a general manager's role. After a disastrous run of nine losses in fifteen games, both Williams and Morgan were sacked in February 1982, with Len Ashurst taking over at Ninian Park. Williams took several coaching jobs abroad including steering Finnish team RoPS to the quarter finals of the European Cup Winners' Cup. Later on in his career he served as the assistant manager of the Welsh national side under Bobby Gould, and held a scouting role at Cheltenham Town while Bobby Gould was manager of the team.

Following his coaching career and scouting for Cheltenham he went in to scouting of academy players for Newcastle, Chelsea and the Tottenham Hotspurs before retiring in 2019

Notable incidents 
Williams was probably part of one of the best compliments to George Best, based on fact but with some poetic licence...

"Will you stand still for a minute so I can look at your face?" asked an exhausted Williams of Best.
"Why?" asked Best in return.
"Because all I've ever seen of you," explained Williams, "is your backside disappearing down the touchline."

George Best and Graham became great friends. Playing charity football matches together and meeting up on regular occasions. George even babysat for Grahams children on a holiday in Tenerife 

In an interview with total football magazine Pele mentioned that in the game on the 14th of may 1966 Graham was the best defender he ever played against. He could not get past him and “kicked me all the time”.  I believe it was the WBA player Stuart Williams who Pele referred to, after the 1958 World Cup.  Graham did not play for Wales until later.  

During the 1968 fa cup final Grahams family was subject to death threats from fans of the opposing team. His family had to have special protection officers

References

External links
Williams' profile

1938 births
Living people
Sportspeople from Rhyl
Welsh footballers
Wales international footballers
Wales under-23 international footballers
Association football defenders
West Bromwich Albion F.C. players
Welsh football managers
Weymouth F.C. managers
Cheltenham Town F.C. non-playing staff
Rovaniemen Palloseura managers
FA Cup Final players